Blattisocius keegani is a species of mites in the family Blattisociidae. It was described by Fox in 1947.

References

Mesostigmata